Carlos Ibáñez García (28 November 1930 – 26 September 2015) was a Chilean football forward who played for Chile in the 1950 FIFA World Cup. He also played for Magallanes.

Ibáñez died on 26 September 2015, at the age of 84.

Record at FIFA Tournaments

References

External links
FIFA profile

1930 births
2015 deaths
Chilean footballers
Chile international footballers
Magallanes footballers
1950 FIFA World Cup players
Association football forwards